Jessica Pietersen (born 23 June 1980) is a British singer, television personality and dancer who was a member of the pop group Liberty X.

Personal life
As a teenager she was a member of the Preston Musical Comedy Society and played the title role in a 1999 production of Gigi.  On 29 December 2007, she married England cricketer Kevin Pietersen at a service in Castle Combe, Wiltshire, with Pietersen's former England teammate Darren Gough as best man. Their first child, a son named Dylan Blake Pietersen, was born on 10 May 2010. Their second child, a daughter named Rosie, was born on 27 December 2015. For Sport Relief 2012, Taylor and Pietersen posed naked under the sheets for Sport Relief, wearing only the official Union Jack socks, to promote the Sainsbury's charity run.

Music career
Liberty X enjoyed seven Top 10 singles from 2001 to 2005. Their biggest hit, "Just a Little", reached number one in May 2002. Its accompanying music video features Taylor wearing a black latex catsuit as part of a gang of professional burglars who steal a diamond from an atrium at the Vintners' Hall in London. "Thinking It Over", "Got to Have Your Love", "Song 4 Lovers", and "Holding on for You" all reached the top 5 in the UK Singles Chart. Their debut album, Thinking It Over, reached number three in the UK Albums Chart June 2002. Liberty X released another 2 albums, Being Somebody and X, which reached number 12 and number 27, respectively. Liberty X won two Brit Awards: for Best British Single and Best British Breakthrough Artist.

Post-music career

Television
Taylor took part in BBC's one-off Strictly Ice Dancing in 2005 and came in second place. She also participated in the fourth series of Dancing on Ice, partnered with Pavel Aubrecht in 2009. They made it to the final, finishing in third place. She subsequently toured with Torvill and Dean on their 25th Anniversary Bolero Tour, performing in arenas across the UK. In 2006 she appeared on a reality TV special of The Weakest Link. Having been the statistical strongest link in rounds one and four, she came undone in round six where she was voted off on a countback, by eventual winner Martin Offiah. Taylor only got one question wrong throughout her entire run.

She appeared on a celebrity edition of The Chase in November 2013, facing Mark Labbett and winning £75,000 in her individual chase. She also appeared on the Hole in the Wall.

Filmography

Discography

Featured singles

References

1980 births
Living people
Musicians from Lancashire
People from Penwortham
Liberty X
English women pop singers